Austria-Hungary (often referred to as the Austro-Hungarian Empire) did not have a common flag (a "national flag" could not exist since the Dual Monarchy consisted of two sovereign states). However, the black-gold flag of the ruling Habsburg Dynasty was sometimes used as a de facto national flag and a common civil ensign was introduced in 1869 for civilian vessels. Until 1918, the k.u.k. War Fleet continued to carry the Austrian ensign it had used since 1786; and the regiments of the k.u.k. Army carried the double-eagle banners they had used before 1867, as they had a long history in many cases. New ensigns created in 1915 were not implemented due to the ongoing war. At state functions, the Austrian black-yellow and the Hungarian red-white-green tricolor were used.

Austria was represented by the black-yellow flag. The Hungarian half of the state, on the other hand, legally had no flag of its own. According to the Croatian–Hungarian Settlement (art. 62 and 63), in all joint Croatian and Hungarian affairs, symbols of both Croatia and Hungary respectively had to be used. For instance, whenever the joint Hungarian-Croatian Parliament held its session in Budapest, both the Croatian and Hungarian flags were hoisted on the parliament building in Budapest. In Vienna, in front of Schönbrunn Palace, the black and yellow flag was flown for Cisleithania (Austrian half), while both Croatian and Hungarian flags were flown for Transleithania (Hungarian half). Hungary proper used a red-white-green tricolor defaced with the Hungarian coat of arms, sometimes used to represent the entirety of the Lands of the Hungarian Crown. The "double" civil ensign, as a symbol of "corporate identity", was also used as the consular flag, as decreed on 18 February 1869. It came into use on 1 August 1869. Legations, however, flew the black-and-yellow flag of Austria alongside the red-white-green flag of Hungary, while embassies flew the two national flags alongside the imperial standard.

Flags as "national/state symbols"

Imperial and military standards

Ensigns 
Civil ensigns

Naval ensigns

Regional flags 
In addition, in Austria-Hungary were also used many different flags in local territories.

Examples of using flags in the era

See also 
 Coat of arms of Austria-Hungary

References

National symbols of Austria-Hungary
Austria-Hungary